Chan Hao-ching and Latisha Chan were the defending champions, but they lost in the first round to Kateryna Bondarenko and Sharon Fichman.

Nadiia Kichenok and Sania Mirza won the title, defeating Peng Shuai and Zhang Shuai in the final, 6–4, 6–4. This was Mirza's first tournament since 2017 after maternity leave.

Seeds

Draw

Draw

References

External Links
Main Draw

Hobart International - Doubles
Doubles